Fiori is a decorative shape of extruded pasta. The Italian term fiori means "flowers". This pasta is similar to rotelle.

See also
List of pasta

Fiori